Jelena Tanasković (born 1976) is a Serbian banker and politician serving as minister of agriculture, forestry and water economy since 2022.

Early life 
Jelena Tanasković was born in 1976 in Belgrade, Socialist Republic of Serbia, Socialist Federal Republic of Yugoslavia. She finished her primary, secondary studies, as well as basic studies of economics in Belgrade.

Career 
She began her career in a privately held external trading firm in the finance sector in 2003; she later worked as a banker for NLB Group for ten years. In 2017, she was appointed as the secretary of finance for Belgrade. A year later, she became the state secretary in the minister of finance, during which she was a close associate of Siniša Mali. In 2020, she was named member of the executive board of Dunav osiguranje and as the state secretary in the ministry of environmental protection.

Minister of Agriculture, Forestry and Water Economy 
It was announced on 23 October 2022 that Tanasković would serve as the minister of agriculture, forestry and water economy in the third cabinet of Ana Brnabić. She was sworn in on 26 October, succeeding Branislav Nedimović.

Political positions 
Tanasković declared that "environmentalism is one of the three key priorities of the country" in July 2021.

Personal life 
Tanasković is married and has two children.

References 

Living people
Government ministers of Serbia
21st-century Serbian politicians
21st-century Serbian women politicians
Women government ministers of Serbia
1976 births
Politicians from Belgrade
Independent politicians in Serbia